

List of professional and semi-professional sports teams in Western New York
Baseball:
American League (MLB)
Toronto Blue Jays (Buffalo, New York—temporary residency as the team awaits reopening of the border)
Triple-A East (AAA)
Buffalo Bisons (Buffalo, New York—currently temporarily playing as the Trenton Thunder during the Blue Jays' residency in Buffalo)
Rochester Red Wings (Rochester, New York)
Basketball:
Premier Basketball League
Rochester Razorsharks (Rochester, New York)
Buffalo Blaze (Buffalo, New York)
Football:
National Football League
Buffalo Bills (Buffalo, New York)
Ice hockey:
National Hockey League (NHL)
Buffalo Sabres (Buffalo, New York)
American Hockey League (AHL)
Rochester Americans (Rochester, New York)
National Women's Hockey League (NWHL)
Buffalo Beauts (Buffalo, New York)
Lacrosse:
National Lacrosse League (NLL)
Buffalo Bandits (Buffalo, New York)
Rochester Knighthawks (Rochester, New York)
Motorsports facilities in New England:
NASCAR
Watkins Glen International (Watkins Glen, New York)
Holland Speedway (Holland, New York)
Soccer:
United Soccer League
Rochester Rhinos (Rochester, New York)
National Premier Soccer League
FC Buffalo (Buffalo, New York)
Rochester Lancers (Rochester, New York)
Major Arena Soccer League
Rochester Lancers (Rochester, New York)

New York (state) sports-related lists
Buffalo, New York-related lists